Ladock, St Clement and St Erme was an electoral division of Cornwall in the United Kingdom which returned one member to sit on Cornwall Council between 2009 and 2021. It was abolished at the 2021 local elections, being succeeded by Truro Tregolls, Probus and St Erme, and St Newlyn East, Cubert and Goonhavern.

Councillors

Extent
Ladock, St Clement and St Erme represented the villages of Malpas, St Clement, Tresillian, Zelah, St Erme, Trispen, Grampound Road and Ladock, and the hamlets of Menna and New Mills. The hamlet of Brighton was shared with the St Enoder division. The division was nominally abolished during boundary changes at the 2013 election, but this had little effect on the ward. Before boundary changes, the division covered 7,243 hectares in total; afterwards it covered 7,242 hectares.

Election results

2017 election

2013 election

2009 election

References

Electoral divisions of Cornwall Council